Unthank is a village in Dumfries and Galloway, Scotland.

References

Villages in Dumfries and Galloway